David Robert Michel (c.1735-1805) was the member of the Parliament of the United Kingdom for Lyme Regis for the parliament of 12 December 1780 to 1784.

References 

Members of the Parliament of Great Britain for Lyme Regis
British MPs 1780–1784
1730s births
1805 deaths
Year of birth uncertain